This is a list of butterfly species in diverse genera with the common name fritillary. The term refers to the chequered markings on the wings, usually black on orange, and derives from the Latin fritillus (meaning dice-box - or, according to some sources, a chequerboard: the fritillary flower, with its chequered markings, has the same derivation).  Most fritillaries belong to the family Nymphalidae.

References

Lists of butterflies
Nature-related lists